André de Resende (1498–1573) was a Dominican friar who is considered to be father of archaeology in Portugal.

He spent many years traveling in Spain, France and Belgium, where he corresponded with Erasmus and other learned men. He was also intimate with King John III and his sons, and acted as tutor to the Infante D. Duarte.

Resende enjoyed considerable fame in his lifetime, although the accuracy of his accounts was later brought into question. In Portuguese he wrote:
Historia da antiguidade da cidade de Evora (ibid. 1553)
Vida do Infante D. Duarte (Lisbon, 1789)
His chief Latin work is the De Antiquitatibus Lusitaniae (Evora, 1593).

See the "Life" of Resende in Farinha's Collecção das antiguidades de Evora (1785), and a biographical-critical article by Rivara in the Revista Litteraria (Porto, 1839), iii. 340-62; also Cleynaerts, Latin Letters.

He is buried in the chapel of the right transept of the Cathedral of Évora, Portugal.

References

1498 births
1573 deaths
Portuguese Dominicans
Portuguese archaeologists
Portuguese Renaissance writers
Portuguese Renaissance humanists
16th-century Portuguese people
People from Évora
Portuguese Roman Catholics